Lawrence Iquaibom (born 5 February 1965) is a Nigerian former weightlifter. He is now a weightlifting official and coach.

Lawrence Iquaibom grew up in the state of Akwa Ibom. After ending his active career as a weightlifter he became an official coach of the weightlifting association of the state of Akwa Ibom as well as technical director of the Nigerian weightlifting association.

He competed in weightlifting at the 1984 Summer Olympics in Los Angeles and the 1988 Summer Olympics in Seoul. In 1984 he competed in the Men’s Featherweight and became 14th of 21 competitors with 107.5 kg in Snatch and 130 kg in Clean and jerk, in 1988 he competed in the Men’s Lightweight and became 12th of 29 competitors with 125 kg in Snatch and 160 kg in Clean and jerk. Hew won the weightlifting competition in the category until 60 kg at the 1987 All-Africa Games in Nairobi with a total of 245.0 kg. At the 1990 Commonwealth Games in Auckland he competed in the Men’s Lightweight and won silver medals for 130 kg in Snatch, 160 kg in Clean and jerk and 290 kg overall.

He is chairman and former coach of Ibom Youths FC, a football club that plays in the Nigeria National League.

Notes and references 

1965 births
Living people
Nigerian male weightlifters
Weightlifters at the 1984 Summer Olympics
Weightlifters at the 1988 Summer Olympics
Olympic weightlifters of Nigeria
Commonwealth Games silver medallists for Nigeria
Weightlifters at the 1990 Commonwealth Games
Commonwealth Games medallists in weightlifting
African Games gold medalists for Nigeria
African Games medalists in weightlifting
Competitors at the 1987 All-Africa Games
20th-century Nigerian people
21st-century Nigerian people
Medallists at the 1990 Commonwealth Games
Nigerian football managers